Saker may refer to:
 Saker falcon (Falco cherrug), a species of falcon
 Saker (cannon), a type of cannon
 Saker Baptist College, an all-girls secondary school in Limbe, Cameroon
 Grupo Saker-Ti, a Guatemalan writers group formed in 1947
 Changwon LG Sakers, a South Korean basketball team
 Saker Cars, a sports car designed in New Zealand
 HMS Saker, a Royal Navy ship
 Saker LSV, a British Army light vehicle

People
 Alan Saker (1921–2001), Australian rules footballer
 Alfred Saker (1814–1880), British Christian missionary to West Africa
 Annie Saker (1882–1932), English actress
 David Saker (born 1966), Australian first-class cricketer
 Dora Saker (1888–1926), cheese-maker for Somerset County Council
 Edward Saker (1838–1883), British actor-manager
 Frank Saker (1907–1980), Canadian flatwater canoeist
 Neil Saker (born 1984), English cricketer
 Rivka Saker, Israeli philanthropist and art collector
 Sardar Saker (1904–1973), Indian film director

See also
 Sake (disambiguation)
 Don Sakers, American science fiction writer
 Saqr Abu Fakhr, assistant editor of the Journal of Palestine Studies